Fort Independence is the name of several forts in the United States:

 Fort Independence (California), U.S. Cavalry fort during the 1860s, now site of the Fort Independence Indian Reservation near Independence, California
 Fort Independence (Colorado), frontier trading post near present-day Pueblo, Colorado
 Fort Independence (Massachusetts), fort located at the mouth of Boston harbor on Castle Island
 Fort Independence (Missouri), in Independence, Missouri; the starting point of the Oregon Trail
 Fort Independence (Nebraska) military installation in Nebraska in the 1900s
 Fort Independence (Vermont), is an infrequently used and incorrect alternative name for Mount Independence in Orwell, Vermont
 Fort Independence, Revolutionary War fort in the Bronx, NY
 Fort Independence (New York), Revolutionary War fort at Peekskill, NY

People
 Fort Independence Indian Community of Paiute Indians, a federally recognized tribe in California